= Thasthara =

Town of ancient Caria

Coordinates: 37°35′37″N 27°38′36″E

Thasthara (Ancient Greek: Θασθαρα) was a town of ancient Caria. It was a polis (city-state) and a member of the Delian League.

Its site is located near Çavdarköy, Asiatic Turkey.
